Shelepikha is a station on the Bolshaya Koltsevaya line of the Moscow Metro. It opened on 26 February 2018 as one of five initial stations on the new line.

A future line, the Rublyovo–Arkhangelskaya line, which the city plans to develop after 2020, will ultimately incorporate this station.

Location
Shelepikha is in the Presnensky District of Moscow’s Central Administrative Okrug. It is about 1.5 kilometers north of the Moscow International Business Center. There are entrances on Shelepikhinskoye Shosse and Shmitovsky Proyezd. The station takes its name from the former settlement of Shelepikha, which was absorbed into Moscow in the early 1900s and Shelepikhinskoye Shosse.

The station is part of a transit hub that allows access to Shelepikha station on the Moscow Central Circle. The hub will include bus routes as well as access to Testovskaya, a station on the Moscow Railway.

References

Moscow Metro stations
Railway stations in Russia opened in 2018
Bolshaya Koltsevaya line
Railway stations located underground in Russia